Amacree or Amachree, was launched in 1788 in Liverpool. She made ten voyages as a slave ship in the triangular trade, carrying enslaved people from West Africa and primarily to Dominica. On her fourth such voyage, she and five other slave ships bombarded Calabar for more than three hours to force the local native traders to lower the prices they were charging for slaves. The last press mention of Amacree occurred in 1801.

Career
Dolben's Act, passed in 1788, limited the number of enslaved people that British ships could transport, based on the ships' tons burthen. It was the first British legislation passed to regulate slave shipping. One of the provisions of the act was bonuses for the master (£100) and surgeon (£50) if the mortality among the captives was under 2%; a mortality rate of under 3% resulted in a bonus of half that. Dolben's Act apparently resulted in some reduction in the numbers of slaves carried per vessel, and possibly in mortality.

1st enslaving voyage (1788–1789): Captain Edward Deane sailed from Liverpool on 27 May 1788, bound for New Calabar. On 10 August Amacree, Dean, master, was well off the coast of Africa, with 100 captives. Amacree arrived at Dominica in December 1788 with 410 captives. Captain Dean died on 12 December, at St George, Grenada, and John Sperling, Jr., replaced him as captain of Amacree. She arrived back at Liverpool on 8 February 1789. She had sailed from Liverpool with 37 crew members and she suffered four crew deaths on her voyage.

Amacree first appeared in Lloyd's Register (LR) in 1789.

2nd enslaving voyage (1789–1790): Captain Roger Lee sailed from Liverpool on 16 April 1789, bound for New Calabar. Amacree arrived at Dominica on 16 September with 282 captives. She sailed for Liverpool on 26 November and arrived back at Liverpool on 7 January 1790. She left Liverpool with 31 crew members and suffered two crew deaths on her voyage.

3rd enslaving voyage (1790): Captain Lee sailed from Liverpool on 20 April 1790, bound for Cape Grand Mount. Amacree arrived at Dominica on 5 October with 300 captives. She sailed on 9 November and arrived back at Liverpool on 25 December. She had left Liverpool with 27 crew members and she suffered three crew deaths on her voyage.

4th slave voyage (1791–1792): Captain Lee sailed from Liverpool on 13 April 1791, bound for West Africa. Amacree started acquiring captives on 24 July.
 
On this voyage Lee, together with five other captains of slave ships, bombarded Calabar for more than three hours to force the local native traders to lower the prices they were charging for captives. The bombardment by some 66 guns killed and wounded 50 or so of the local inhabitants and resulted in the traders agreeing to the prices the captains offered.

Amacree sailed from Africa on 16 February 1792 and arrived at Dominica on 14 April with 406 captives. She sailed from Dominica on 19 May and arrived back at Liverpool on 26 June. She had left Liverpool with 27 crew members and she suffered eight crew deaths on the voyage.

5th slave voyage (1792–1793): Captain William Platt sailed from Liverpool on 28 September 1792. Captain Platt died on 11 October, and Thomas Bourke replaced him as captain. Amacree acquired captives at Calabar and Bonny. She arrived at Dominica on 30 June 1793 with 217 captives. She arrived back at Liverpool on 1 October 1793. She had left Liverpool with 27 crew members and suffered 10 crew deaths on her voyage.

6th slave voyage (1794–1795): Captain John Hewan acquired a letter of marque on 16 June 1794. He sailed from Liverpool on 8 July, bound for Loango. Amacree began acquiring captives on 27 September and departed Africa on 9 January 1795, having embarked 351 captives. She arrived at Havana on 26 March with 347 slaves, for a mortality rate of about 1%, which would have qualified master and surgeon for bonuses. Sarah separated from Chaser on the 20th through the Gulf of Mexico, and from Amacree on the 29th, north of Bermuda. Amacree arrived at Liverpool on 4 July. She had left Liverpool with 34 crew members and suffered seven deaths on her voyage.

7th enslaving voyage (1797–1798): Captain Thomas Mullion sailed from Liverpool on 6 June 1797, bound for Bonny. Amacree arrived at Dominica on 25 December with 349 captives. She left for Liverpool on 19 January 1798 and arrived there on 26 February. She had left Liverpool with 43 crew members and suffered one crew death on her voyage.

8th enslaving voyage (1798–1799): Captain Richard Kendall sailed from Liverpool on 14 June 1798, bound for Bonny. Amacree arrived at Dominica on 28 November with 345 captives. She sailed for Liverpool on 10 March 1799 and arrived there on 19 April. She had left Liverpool with 47 crew members and suffered 10 crew deaths on her voyage.

9th enslaving voyage (1799–1800): Captain William Maxwell sailed from Liverpool on 1 August 1799, bound for New Calabar. Amacree arrived at Dominica on 27 January 1800 with 325 captives. She sailed for Liverpool on 24 April and arrived there on 22 June. She had left Liverpool with 35 crew members and suffered seven crew deaths on her voyage.

10th enslaving voyage (1800–1801): Captain Thomas Houghton acquired a letter of marque on 4 September 1800. He sailed from Liverpool on 20 October, bound for Cape Grand Mount. Amacree arrived at Martinique on 12 June 1801 with 211 captives. She arrived back at Liverpool on 27 September. Her cargo to Liverpool consisted of ivory, pepper, sugar, cotton, wine, "noyeau" (nuts), and succades. On her way back from Martinique she had to put into Cork, in distress.

Fate
Although LR continued to carry Amacree for a number of years with stale data, she did not again appear in any ship arrival and departure data after her return to Liverpool in 1801.

Notes

Citations

References
 
 
 
 

1788 ships
Age of Sail merchant ships of England
Liverpool slave ships